Michel Scob (né Scobeltzine; (Russian: Скобельцын); 26 April 1935 – 7 September 1995) was a French cyclist. He competed in the 1000m time trial and tandem events at the 1960 Summer Olympics. He was the older brother of French film and theatre actress Édith Scob.

References

External links
 

1935 births
1995 deaths
Sportspeople from Nord (French department)
French male cyclists
Olympic cyclists of France
Cyclists at the 1960 Summer Olympics
Cyclists from Hauts-de-France
French people of Russian descent